Claudia Raffelhüschen (born 1968 in Cologne) is a German economist and politician of the Free Democratic Party (FDP) who has been serving as a Member of the German Bundestag since 2021, representing the Freiburg district.

Political career
Raffelhüschen took the seat of Christian Jung, who resigned his seat right after the 2021 federal election. In parliament, she has since been serving on the Finance Committee, the Budget Committee and the Audit Committee. On the Budget Committee, she is her parliamentary group’s rapporteur on the annual budget of the Federal Ministry for Economic Cooperation and Development.

Other activities
 GIZ, Member of the Supervisory Board (since 2022) 
 Plan International – Germany, Member of the Board of Trustees (since 2022)

References

See also 

 List of members of the 20th Bundestag

Living people
1968 births
Free Democratic Party (Germany) politicians
21st-century German women politicians

Members of the Bundestag for Baden-Württemberg
Members of the Bundestag 2021–2025
Female members of the Bundestag
University of Kiel alumni